The Philippine Association of State Universities and Colleges (PASUC) is an association of public tertiary school level institutions in the Philippines. These comprises all 102 State Universities and Colleges (SUC) which are under the Commission on Higher Education (CHED). PASUC holds its sports, literary, and musical competition annually participated by its member.

Regional Members
The State Universities and Colleges (SUCs) members are grouped in three according to its region.
 Luzon Association of State Universities and Colleges (LASUC)
 Visayas Association of State Universities and Colleges (VASUC)
 Mindanao Association State Colleges and Universities Foundation (MASCUF)

List of state-run colleges and universities by location

Luzon Association of State Universities and Colleges (LASUC)

National Capital Region (NCR) members

Visayas Association of State Universities and Colleges (VASUC)

Mindanao Association State Tertiary Schools (MASTS)

References

External links
Philippine Association of State Universities and Colleges

 
State universities and colleges in the Philippines
Mindanao Association State Colleges and Universities Foundation
Higher education in the Philippines